Septin 12 is a protein that in humans is encoded by the SEPT12 gene.

Function 

This gene encodes a guanine-nucleotide binding protein and member of the septin family of cytoskeletal GTPases. Septins play important roles in cytokinesis, exocytosis, embryonic development, and membrane dynamics. Multiple transcript variants encoding different isoforms have been found for this gene.

References

Further reading

External links